Quakake Creek (pronounced QWAY-kake) is a  tributary of Black Creek in Carbon County, Pennsylvania in the United States.

See also
List of rivers of Pennsylvania

References

Tributaries of the Lehigh River
Rivers of Pennsylvania
Rivers of Carbon County, Pennsylvania